Running the Bases is a 2022 American Christian sports film written and directed by Marty Roberts and Jimmy Womble. It stars Brett Varvel, Gigi Orsillo, Todd Terry, and Cameron Arnett, and follows a small-town baseball coach who becomes the head coach of a large high school program, but soon faces opposition to his coaching methods. It was released on September 16, 2022.

Premise 
"A small-town baseball coach gets the offer of a lifetime from a larger 6A High School, he uproots his family and leaves the only home he's ever known. But as a man of faith, he soon faces extreme opposition to his coaching methods from the school superintendent."

Cast

Production 
Filming took place on a $3.3 million budget in Harrison, Arkansas in May and June 2021.

Release 
Running the Bases was released in the United States on September 16, 2022. The film made $538,749 from 1,080 theaters in its opening weekend. 86% of the audience was Caucasian, with 51% being female and 79% over the age of 35; PostTrak reported filmgoers gave the film an 86% positive score.

References

External links
 
 

2022 films
2022 independent films
2020s English-language films
2020s American films
American independent films
American baseball films
American sports drama films
Films about Christianity
Films about religion